Andrea Cittadino (born 25 April 1994) is an Italian professional footballer who plays as a midfielder for  club Potenza on loan from Trento.

Club career
Born in Rome, Cittadino made his footballer formation in local club A.S. Roma. He left Roma in 2013, and joined to Feralpisalò.

On the 2017–18 season, he signed with Serie D club Latina. He played three seasons in Serie D, the last one on the 2019–20 season for Foggia.

On 7 September 2021, he joined Serie C club Gubbio.

On 15 July 2022, Cittadino signed a two-year contract with Trento. On 17 January 2023, he joined Potenza on loan with an obligation to buy.

International career
In 2011, Cittadino played a match for Italy U18 against Ukraine.

References

External links
 
 

1994 births
Living people
Footballers from Rome
Italian footballers
Association football midfielders
Italy youth international footballers
Serie C players
Serie D players
A.S. Roma players
FeralpiSalò players
U.S. Alessandria Calcio 1912 players
A.S. Melfi players
Mantova 1911 players
Latina Calcio 1932 players
Calcio Foggia 1920 players
A.S. Bisceglie Calcio 1913 players
A.S. Gubbio 1910 players
A.C. Trento 1921 players
Potenza Calcio players